The Weekender is an arts entertainment weekly published in Wilkes-Barre, Pennsylvania, for the city and surrounding northeastern Pennsylvania communities, with distribution every Wednesday.

The Weekender started as an independent entertainment weekly in 1993. It was purchased by the Times Leader group later in 1993. The Weekender claimed to have grown to be northeastern Pennsylvania's arts and entertainment weekly with the highest circulation, reporting that it had distributed 40,000 copies in print, through more than 1,000 locations, covering five Pennsylvania counties, with more than 174,000 readers.

References

Further reading
 Article on annual awards given by The Weekender.
 A new day: Avant Publications acquires Times Leader Media Group
 First of two articles, at The Times-Tribune, on a "stolen valour" controversy associated with a guest column in the newspaper, which grew to receive regional and national attention.
 Second of two articles, at Fox News, on a "stolen valour" controversy associated with a guest column in the newspaper, which grew to receive regional and national attention.

Newspapers published in Pennsylvania
Wilkes-Barre, Pennsylvania
1991 establishments in Pennsylvania